Shane Embury (born 27 November 1967) is a British bassist and a member of the grindcore and death metal band Napalm Death since 1987.

Career

Napalm Death 

While not a founding member, Embury is the longest standing member of the band, having taken part in the Scum tour, replacing previous bassist Jim Whitely in 1987. He was a fan of the band before he joined, first seeing them perform at Midlands venue The Mermaid the previous year and becoming close friends of the members of the band, particularly Mick Harris. Nicholas Bullen, the founding member of the band, originally asked Embury to join them before the recording of the B-side of the debut album Scum but Embury eventually declined due to nervousness, his biggest regret.

Warhammer 
Before joining Napalm Death, Embury played drums in a death metal band called Warhammer with Mitch Dickinson. The band released one demo in 1985 called Abattoir of Death. After Warhammer, Embury and Mitch did work as Unseen Terror. Embury also played drums in Azagthoth with fellow Warhammer guitarist Wayne Aston and bassist Pete Giles. Azagthoth recorded one demo at Rich Bitch Studios in Birmingham called Shredded Flesh.

Other projects 
Embury has a long list of side projects. He performed in the grindcore band Unseen Terror with Dickinson, who was also a member of Heresy.  He formed an industrial metal band called Blood from the Soul with Lou Koller from New York's Sick of It All, which released their debut album, To Spite The Gland That Breeds, in 1993; the project reformed in 2020 to release a sophomore record, DSM-5. He was in an industrial band with Mitch Harris and several Obituary members called Meathook Seed.  He was also part of an unconventional band called Malformed Earthborn with Brutal Truth's bass player Dan Lilker, Lock Up with Tomas Lindberg of At the Gates, and Brujeria, a Mexican death metal band.

Embury also plays with Napalm Death bandmate Danny Herrera, Kevin Sharp of Brutal Truth, and Dan Lilker of Nuclear Assault and Brutal Truth in the band Venomous Concept; and has recently toured with UK black metal/grindcore band Anaal Nathrakh. Embury recently resurrected a musical project called Absolute Power with close producer friends Simon Efemey & Russ Russell which he started in 2000, featuring Tim "Ripper" Owens on vocals & Brian Tatler of Diamond Head on guitar. Their debut album was finally released on download only though Embury's Feto Records label in 2011. More recently, Embury played on the latest Liquid Graveyard album, By Nature So Perverse with Cancer frontman and guitarist John Walker, drummer Nicholas Barker and vocalist Raquel Walker, released in 2016.

Personal life 
Born in Broseley, Shropshire, he lives with his wife in Birmingham, West Midlands, and loves horror and science fiction books, movies and comics. He has tattoos on both of his arms, including the Napalm Death logo and the "Life?" image on his left arm.

References

External links

Napalm Death members
Death metal musicians
English heavy metal bass guitarists
Male bass guitarists
English heavy metal drummers
1967 births
Living people
Musicians from Birmingham, West Midlands
Musicians from Shropshire
People from Broseley
Lock Up (British band) members
Brujeria (band) members
Grindcore musicians
British industrial musicians
British punk rock musicians